The International Baseball Board was founded in 1927 and is the international governing body for traditional British baseball codes.

It has two member organisations, the English Baseball Association and the Welsh Baseball Union. It is not to be confused with the International Baseball Federation, which is the world governing body for the American code of baseball.

The board oversees the annual international matches between the representative teams from England and Wales, which are played at A and B level for men, and at age-group level for boys.

The first such international game was held in Cardiff in 1908 and the centenary international was also held in Cardiff in 2008. Wales won on both occasions.

References

External links
Welsh Baseball 
English Baseball Association

British baseball in the United Kingdom
Sports organizations established in 1927
International sports organizations